Jorge Daniel González Marquet (born 25 March 1988) is a Paraguayan footballer who plays as midfielder for General Díaz.

Career

Club career
Raúl made his professional debut with Libertad in 2006 then play with Tacuary, Rubio Ñu back in Libertad and since 2016 in Cerro Porteño.

References

External links
 Jorge González at playmakerstats.com (formerly thefinalball.com)
 
 
  

1988 births
Living people
Paraguayan footballers
Paraguayan expatriate footballers
Paraguayan Primera División players
Campeonato Brasileiro Série A players
Club Libertad footballers
Club Tacuary footballers
Club Rubio Ñu footballers
Cerro Porteño players
Paraná Clube players
General Díaz footballers
People from Alto Paraná Department
Association football midfielders
Paraguayan expatriate sportspeople in Brazil
Expatriate footballers in Brazil